Zeros & Heroes is the fifth studio album by Swedish rap metal band Clawfinger, released on 26 May 2003 through GUN and Supersonic labels.

It offers yet another musical style change. The electronic sound and synthesizers from A Whole Lot of Nothing are replaced by a more complex and melodic guitar riffing.

Track listing 
 "Zeros & Heroes" – 4:10
 "Recipe for Hate" – 2:55
 "When Everything Crumbles" – 3:51
 "15 Minutes of Fame" – 3:35
 "World Domination" – 3:55
 "Bitch" – 3:49
 "Four Letter Word" – 3:22
 "Money Power Glory" – 3:33
 "Kick It" – 3:17
 "Live Like a Man" – 2:51
 "Step Aside" – 3:12
 "Blame" – 3:53

Bonus tracks
13. "Are You Talking to Me" – 2:33
14. "Where Are You Now" – 3:21
15. "Point of No Return" – 4:25

Some versions have only one short bonus track, "I Gave You My Middle Clawfinger", 12 seconds long with one line of lyrics, at track #86, and tracks #13-85, 87-98 are blank.

Reception

Released singles 

"Recipe for Hate"
Clawfinger hired a company to make a video for this single, which is the one still mainly shown on television. However, Clawfinger was not entirely satisfied with the work by the company, so Jocke Skog created a new edit of the clip, removing the cinematic elements and keeping the scenes which show the band playing. This version of the clip is available for download on the Clawfinger website.

Credits 
Engineer – Clawfinger
Engineer [@ Polar Studios] – Ulf Kruckenberg
Mastered by – Björn Engelman
Mixed by – Jocke Skog
Music by, lyrics by – Clawfinger
Musician [additional] – Henka Johansson, Tomas Haake
Producer – Clawfinger, Jacob Hellner (tracks: 7 8 12)

References 

Clawfinger albums
2003 albums